"Colliding Branes" is a science fiction short story by Rudy Rucker and Bruce Sterling. It was first published in the February 2009 issue of Asimov's Science Fiction.

Synopsis 
The story follows two bloggers, Angelo Rasmussen and Rabbiteen Chandra, on the last night before the end of the Ekpyrotic universe and the beginning of a new one.

Reception 
The Internet Review of Science Fiction's Lois Tilton reviewed '"Colliding Branes" as "fun stuff." Tangent Online's Bob Blough reviewed it as "more fun than past collaborations."

"Colliding Branes" placed at fourteenth place in the Locus Award for Best Short Story.

References

External links 
Short story

2009 short stories
Science fiction short stories
Short stories by Bruce Sterling